Nomada lusca, is a species of bee belonging to the family Apidae subfamily Nomadinae. It is found in Sri Lanka, India and Philippines.

References

External links
 ADW: Nomada lusca: CLASSIFICATION
 AN UPDATED CHECKLIST OF BEES OF SRI LANKA WITH NEW RECORDS | Inoka Karunaratne - Academia.edu
 http://www.atlashymenoptera.net/biblio/Karunaratne_et_al_2006_Sri_Lanka.pdf

Nomadinae
Insects described in 1854